Rafael Mario Ramón Llerena (March 5, 1913 – December 10, 2006) was a Cuban intellectual who worked alongside Fidel Castro to topple Fulgencio Batista but, opposing communism, broke with Castro after he gained power.

Biography
Llerena was born in Placetas, Las Villas.  Intending to become a Christian minister, he attended Princeton Theological Seminary, but then switched careers.  He taught Spanish at Duke University before returning to Cuba.  He also received a doctorate of philosophy and letters from the University of Havana.

Llerena met Castro in the 1950s, and at his request wrote a document, "Nuestra Razón", explaining the democratic ideals of the uprising Castro was planning.  In 1957, he was named chairman of the New York branch of the July 26 Movement, and played a pivotal role in circumventing Batista's attempts at censorship during the uprising.

Citing ideological differences, he resigned from the movement before Castro's triumph on January 1, 1959.  He criticized Castro's shift toward Communism, and ultimately fled the country in 1960.  He became a strong voice among other exiles, publishing numerous essays and a book in 1978 called The Unsuspected Revolution: The Birth and Rise of Castroism, in which he claims many of Castro's followers were deceived by his drift to Communism.

He died in 2006 in Miami, Florida of natural causes.

References

1913 births
2006 deaths
People from Placetas
Cuban revolutionaries
Cuban soldiers
Cuban people of Catalan descent
Duke University faculty
Cuban essayists
Cuban male writers
Male essayists
People of the Cuban Revolution
20th-century essayists